

Incumbents
Monarch: Norodom Sihamoni
Prime Minister: Hun Sen

Events
February 15 – First round of matches of the 2020 C-League.
February 22 – Second round of matches of the 2020 C-League.
February 29 – Third round of matches of the 2020 C-League.
March 7 – Forth round of matches of the 2020 C-League.
November 16 – United Nations Human Rights Special Rapporteurs voice their concerns over "tightening restrictions on civil society in Cambodia." They drew attention to reports of threats, arbitrary arrests and detentions of at least 21 human rights defenders in 2020.

Deaths

References

 
2020s in Cambodia
Years of the 21st century in Cambodia
Cambodia